William Henry Hartnell (8 January 1908 – 23 April 1975) was an English actor. He is best remembered for his portrayal of the first incarnation of the Doctor in Doctor Who from 1963 to 1966. In film, Hartnell notably appeared in Brighton Rock (1949), The Mouse That Roared (1959) and This Sporting Life (1963). He was associated with military roles, playing Company Sergeant Major Percy Bullimore in the ITV sitcom The Army Game (1957, 1961) and Sergeant Grimshaw, the title character in the first Carry On film Carry On Sergeant (1958).

Early life
Hartnell was born on 8 January 1908 in the slums of the district of St Pancras, London, England, the only child of Lucy Hartnell, an unmarried mother. Hartnell never discovered the identity of his father, whose particulars were left blank on his birth certificate, despite his efforts to trace him. In various interviews, he claimed that he was born in Seaton, Devon, and that his father was a dairy farmer, but later said he was a soldier turned stockbroker.

Hartnell was brought up partly by a foster mother, and also spent many holidays in Devon with his mother's family of farmers, from whom he learned to ride horses. Reportedly, Hartnell had a fall and was kicked by a horse. An unspecified person applied disinfectant to the open wound in an apparent attempt to cleanse it. However, the disinfectant was of a type unsuitable for first aid purposes and caused blisters. The end result was a more serious wound than would have otherwise occurred. That left him with a large scar on his temple, which is visible in some of his stills shots even though it was covered with make-up during filming. He was a second cousin of the fashion designer Norman Hartnell.

Hartnell left school without prospects and dabbled in petty crime. At the age of 16, he met the art collector Hugh Blaker, who later became his unofficial guardian, arranged for him to train as a jockey, and helped him to enter the Italia Conti Academy. Theatre being a passion of Blaker's, he paid for Hartnell to receive some "polish" at the Imperial Service College, though Hartnell found the strictures too much and ran away.  When Hartnell married, he and his wife continued to live in one of Blaker's adjacent properties at Isleworth and their daughter was born there in 1929.

Career

Early career
Hartnell entered the theatre in 1925 working under Frank Benson as a general stagehand. He appeared in numerous Shakespearian plays, including The Merchant of Venice (1926), Julius Caesar (1926), As You Like It (1926), Hamlet (1926), The Tempest (1926) and Macbeth (1926).  He also appeared in She Stoops to Conquer (1926), The School for Scandal (1926) and Good Morning, Bill (1927), before performing in Miss Elizabeth's Prisoner (1928). This play was written by Robert Neilson Stephens and E. Lyall Swete. It featured the actress Heather McIntyre, whom he married during the following year. His first of more than 60 film appearances was in Say It With Music (1932).

Radio work also featured in his career, with his earliest known performance – in a production of Chinese Moon Party – being broadcast by the BBC on 11 May 1931.

From the outbreak of the Second World War, Hartnell attempted to volunteer for the RAF. He served in the British Army in the Tank Corps, but he was invalided out after 18 months as the result of a nervous breakdown and returned to acting. In 1942, he was cast as Albert Fosdike in Noël Coward's film In Which We Serve. He turned up late for his first day of shooting, and Coward berated him in front of the cast and crew for his unprofessionalism, made him personally apologise to everyone and then sacked him. Michael Anderson, who was the first assistant director, took over the part (and was credited as "Mickey Anderson").

Hartnell continued to play comic characters until he was cast in the robust role of Sergeant Ned Fletcher in The Way Ahead (1944). From then on, his career was defined by playing mainly policemen, soldiers and thugs. This typecasting bothered him, for even when he was cast in comedies he found he invariably played the "heavy". In 1958, he played the sergeant in the first Carry On comedy film, Carry On Sergeant. He appeared as serjeant-at-arms of Grand Fenwick Will Buckley, another military character, in the film The Mouse That Roared (1959), which starred Peter Sellers, and he played a town councillor in the Boulting brothers' film Heavens Above! (1963), again with Sellers.

His first regular role on television was as Sergeant Major Percy Bullimore in The Army Game in 1957. He left after the first season and returned for the final season in 1961. Again, although it was a comedy series, he found himself cast in a "tough guy" role. He also appeared in a supporting role in the film version of This Sporting Life (1963), giving a sensitive performance as an ageing rugby league talent scout known as "Dad".

Hartnell described himself as "a legitimate character actor of the theatre and film".

Doctor Who
Hartnell's performance in This Sporting Life was liked by Verity Lambert, the producer who was setting up a new science-fiction television series for the BBC entitled Doctor Who; mainly on the strength of that performance, Lambert offered him the title role. Although Hartnell was initially uncertain about accepting a part in what was pitched to him as a children's series, in part due to his success in films, Lambert and director Waris Hussein convinced him to take the part, and it became the character for which he gained the highest profile and is now most remembered. Hartnell later revealed that he took the role because it led him away from the gruff, military parts in which he had become typecast, and, having two grandchildren of his own, he came to relish particularly the attention and affection that playing the character brought him from children. His first episode of Doctor Who aired on 23 November 1963.

Doctor Who earned Hartnell a regular salary of £315 an episode by 1966 (in the era of 48 weeks per year production on the series), . By comparison, in 1966 his co-stars Anneke Wills and Michael Craze were earning £68 and £52 per episode at the same time, respectively. Throughout his tenure as the Doctor, Hartnell wore a wig when playing the part, as the character had long hair.

Hartnell described his character the Doctor as "a wizard", and "a cross between the Wizard of Oz and Father Christmas". According to William Russell, Hartnell deliberately became occasionally tongue-tied and stumbled over words.

According to some of his colleagues on Doctor Who, Hartnell could be a difficult person to work with, though others, Russell and Peter Purves, and the producer Lambert, spoke glowingly of him. Among the more caustic accounts, Nicholas Courtney and Wills have accused Hartnell of being racist or anti-Semitic. According to his granddaughter Jessica Carney, who wrote his biography, Hartnell could be very bigoted and often came out with xenophobic comments but "all those loudly expressed opinions were contradicted by his behaviour on a personal level". Hartnell adored Carole Ann Ford and Lambert, both Jewish, and had great respect for Hussein, who is Indian. According to Val Speyer, although Hartnell claimed not to like foreigners, "as one of his greatest friends on the show was half Greek and half Maltese, I didn't see how this could figure. However, if he liked someone, they weren't a foreigner, they were a friend!"

Hartnell's deteriorating health (he suffered from undiagnosed arteriosclerosis) began to affect his ability to learn his lines, with the problem increasing as his time on the series progressed. In addition, he had a poor relationship with a new production team on the series following the departure of Lambert. He left Doctor Who in 1966. When he departed the producer of the show came up with the idea that, since the Doctor is an alien, he could transform himself physically, thereby renewing himself. Hartnell suggested the actor who should play the new Doctor, stating that "There's only one man in England who can take over, and that's Patrick Troughton." In the fourth episode of the serial The Tenth Planet the First Doctor regenerates into Troughton's Second Doctor.

Hartnell reprised the role of the Doctor in Doctor Who during the tenth anniversary story The Three Doctors (1972–73). When Hartnell's wife Heather found out about his planned involvement, she informed the show's crew that his failing memory and weakening health would prevent him from starring in the special. An agreement was made between the crew and Heather that Hartnell would sit down during the shoot and read his lines from cue cards. His appearance in this story was his final piece of work as an actor due to his declining health. 

Many of Hartnell's episodes are missing from the archives as a result of the then-standard practice of discarding old shows.

Personal life
Hartnell was married to Heather McIntyre from 9 May 1929 until his death. They had a daughter, Heather Anne, and two grandchildren. After living at 51 Church Street, Isleworth, next door to Hugh Blaker, the Hartnells lived on Thames Ditton Island. Then in the 1960s they moved to a cottage in Mayfield, Sussex. They lived in later life at Sheephurst Lane in Marden, Kent. Heather Hartnell died in 1984.

Later life and death
Hartnell's health had worsened during the early 1970s and, in December 1974, he was admitted to hospital permanently. In early 1975, he suffered a series of strokes, brought on by cerebrovascular disease, and he died in his sleep of heart failure on 23 April 1975 at the age of 67.

Legacy
The only published biography of him is by his granddaughter, Judith "Jessica" Carney, entitled Who's There? The Life and Career of William Hartnell. It was first published in 1996 by Virgin Publishing. To mark the 50th anniversary of Doctor Who Carney, with Fantom Publishing, revised and republished the book in 2013.

For the 50th anniversary of Doctor Who in 2013 the BBC broadcast An Adventure in Space and Time, a dramatisation of the events surrounding the creation of the series, which featured David Bradley portraying Hartnell.

A blue plaque marking Hartnell's work in film and television was unveiled at Ealing Studios by Carney on 14 October 2018.

Filmography

Film

Television

References

Bibliography

External links

 
 

1908 births
1975 deaths
20th-century English male actors
Alumni of the Italia Conti Academy of Theatre Arts
British Army personnel of World War II
British male comedy actors
English adoptees
English male film actors
English male Shakespearean actors
English male stage actors
English male television actors
Male actors from Kent
Male actors from London
People educated at the Imperial Services College
People from Marden, Kent
People from Mayfield, East Sussex
People from St Pancras, London
Royal Tank Regiment soldiers
Military personnel from London